The End of America may refer to:

Media
 The End of America: Letter of Warning to a Young Patriot (book) 2007 non-fiction politics book by Naomi Wolfe about dictatorship and constitutionalism
 The End of America (film), 2008 documentary film based on the eponymous book by Naomi Wolfe, covering the G. W. Bush administration

Geography
 List of extreme points of the United States
 List of extreme points of U.S. states and territories
 Extreme points of the Americas

See also
 Mutual assured destruction, nuclear-deterrence policy by enabling the destructive end of the United States and the Soviet Union
 End of the world (disambiguation)